Amravati (pronunciation (help·info)) is the second largest city in the Vidarbha region and ninth largest city in Maharashtra, India. It is administrative headquarters of Amravati district and Amravati division which includes Akola, Buldhana, Washim, and Yavatmal districts. It is one of the Maharashtra's nominated city under Smart Cities Mission.

The ancient name of Amravati is “Udumbravati”, prākrut form of this is “Umbravati” and “Amravati” is known for many centuries with this name. Amravati is the incorrect pronunciation of this, and as a result, it now goes by that name. Amravati is claimed to have gotten its name from the city's historic Ambadevi temple. The stone inscription on the base of the marble statue of God Adinath (Jain God) Rishabhanath serves as an Old Testament of Amravati's existence. This demonstrates that these statues were erected in this location in 1097. When Govind Maha Prabhu visited Amravati in the 13th century, Warhad was ruled by the Hindu King of Devagiree (Yadav)

Famine (drought) struck Amravati in the fourteenth century, and residents fled to Gujarat and Malwa. After several years, the locals were brought back to Amravati, where the population was sparse. Mager Aurangpura, now known as "Sabanpura," was given to Jamia Masjid by Aurangzeb in the sixteenth century. This demonstrates that Muslims and Hindus coexisted in this area. When Amravati had become known as Bhosle ki Amravati in 1722, Chhatrapati Shahu Maharaj gave Amrāvati and Badnera to Shri Ranoji Bhosle. The city was reconstructed and prospered by Ranoji Bhosle after the treaty of Devgaon and Anjangaon Surji and victory over Gavilgad (Fort of Chikhaldara).

The Amravati residents still refer to the location where the British general Colonel Wellesly camped as a camp. At the conclusion of the 18th century, the city of Amravati was founded. Amravati was governed by the Nizam and Bosale union state. Although the revenue officer was appointed, the defense system suffered. British forces took control of Gavilgad Fort on December 15, 1803. According to the Deogaon pact, Nizam received the Warhād as a sign of friendship. Pindāri invaded Amravati city in or around 1805.

In 1983, Amravati became Vidarbha's second Municipal corporation. Located about 663 (412 mi) kilometers east of the state capital Mumbai and 152 (94 mi) kilometers west of Nagpur, Amravati is the second largest city of the Vidarbha region after Nagpur.

Geography 
It has an average elevation of 343 meters (1125 feet). The city is located near the passes through the hills that separate the cotton-growing regions of the Purna basin to the West and the Wardha basin to the East. Chikhaldara is about 80 km from Amravati city which is the only hill station in the Vidarbha region.

Climate 
Amravati has a tropical wet and dry climate with hot, dry summers and mild to cool winters. Summer lasts from March to June, monsoon season from July to October, and winter from November to March.

The highest and lowest temperatures ever recorded were 49.1 °C on 25 May 2013 and 5.0 °C on 9 February 1887 respectively.

Demographics 
The population of Amravati city in 2011 was 646,801; of which males and females are 330,544 and 316,257 respectively. The sex ratio of Amravati city is 957 per 1000 males. The population in the age range of 0–6 years was 62,497. The effective literacy rate (population over 7 years of age) was 93.03%.

Religion
Hinduism is the major religion in Amravati with 61.8% followers, with Islam having 23.7% and Buddhism having 12.8% followers.

Government and politics 

Amravati Municipal Corporation is the local authority in the city. It is headed by a mayor who is assisted by a deputy mayor elected for a tenure of three years. It was established on 15 August 1983. The area governed by the Municipal Corporation at that time was 121.65  km2 comprising the erstwhile Municipal Councils of Amravati and Badnera along with eighteen revenue villages.

Tourist attractions 
Some tourist destinations located on or near Amravati include:
Ambadevi Temple
Ekviradevi Temple
Chatri Lake
Wadali Lake
Bamboo Udyan
Chikhaldara
Melghat Tiger Reserve

Transport

Road 
The star city bus services are run by the Amravati Municipal Corporation. Private auto rickshaws and cycle rickshaws are also popular. Amravati has also started a Women's Special City bus which is a first in the Vidarbha region.

The Maharashtra State Road Transport Corporation (MSRTC) provides transport services for intercity and interstate travel. Many private operators also ply on the highly traveled Amravati – Pune and Amravati – Indore routes. Bus services to cities like Nagpur, Yavatmal, Bhopal, Harda, Indore, Raipur, Jabalpur, Mumbai, Pune, Akola, Dharni, Nanded, Aurangabad, Jalna, Burhanpur, Parbhani, Solapur, Khandwa, Gondia, Shirdi, Hyderabad, Paratwada (Achalpur) and Kolhapur are also available.

National Highway 6 (old numbering), which runs from Hazira (Surat) to Kolkata, passes through Amravati.

New Star City Buses are launched in the city replacing the old city buses.

Railway 
Amravati has three railway stations: 
 Amravati railway station, situated in the heart of the city is a terminus. The railway line could not be extended beyond it. Therefore, a new station was constructed outside the city when a new railway line was laid to connect Badnera junction to Narkhed on the Nagpur-Itarsi main railway line. Amravati railway station is situated on the branch line from Badnera on Nagpur-Bhusawal section of Howrah-Nagpur-Mumbai line of Central Railways.
 New Amravati railway station building was inaugurated on 10 December 2011. Amravati railway station provides multiple shuttle services to Badnera throughout the day.
 Badnera Junction railway station serves the area of Badnera in Amravati. It is a junction station on the Howrah-Nagpur-Mumbai line. There is a broad gauge line to Narkhed.

Airport 
Dr. Panjabrao Deshmukh Airport Amravati, located at Bellora, 15 kilometers from NH-6 towards Yavatmal, is operated by the Maharashtra Airport Development Company (MADC). Presently it has no commercial scheduled flights. The Nagpur Flying Club has applied to DGCA for permission to shift its flying operations to Amravati airport. It also has a helipad facility. MADC is acquiring about 400 Hectares of land for developing the airport and related facilities at an estimated cost of Rs. 2.25 billion.

Education

 Dr. Panjabrao Deshmukh Memorial Medical College
 Dr. Punjabrao Deshmukh Polytechnic College
 Sant Gadge Baba Amravati University
  Government College of Engineering, Amravati
 Government Polytechnic, Amravati
  Shivaji Education Society

Sports

Territorial Army Parade Ground 
Territorial Army Parade Ground is a multi-purpose stadium in the city, formerly known as the Reforms Club Ground. 1958 First recorded Cricket match was held in 1958. The ground is owned and managed by the Territorial Army, a part-time branch of the Indian Army. The ground is mainly used for organizing football and cricket matches and other sports. 
The stadium hosted one Ranji Trophy match in 1976 when the Vidarbha cricket team played against the Rajasthan cricket team.

Hanuman Vyayam Prasarak Mandal Ground 
In Hanuman Vyayam Prasarak Mandal a cricket ground is present that held a single first-class match when Vidarbha cricket team played Rajasthan cricket team in the 1980/81 Ranji Trophy, which resulted in a Rajasthan victory by 7 wickets.

Notable people 

 Suresh Bhat
 Mohan Choti
 Bhagwan Dada
 Sunil Deshmukh
 Bharat Ganeshpure
 Gajanan Jagirdar
 Moropant Vishvanath Joshi
 Waman Gopal Joshi
 Vikas Mahatme
 Pratibha Patil
 Shripad Balwant Tambe
 Shiv Thakare
 Prabhakar Vaidya
 Punjabrao Deshmukh

See also 
 Make in Maharashtra
 Amravati division
 List of districts of Maharashtra

References

External links 
 

 
Talukas in Maharashtra
Cities in Maharashtra